Enoque Paulo Guilherme (born 16 August 1987), better known as Enoque, is an Angolan football defender, in Angola's top league, the Girabola.

External links

1987 births
Living people
Angolan footballers
Angola international footballers
Atlético Sport Aviação players
F.C. Bravos do Maquis players
G.D. Interclube players
Santos Futebol Clube de Angola players
Girabola players
Association football defenders